is a Japanese manga series written by Hazuki Takeoka and illustrated by Tiv. The series is published by Ichijinsha and was serialized in their Monthly Comic Rex magazine in Japan from October 2012 to June 2018. The series is licensed by Seven Seas Entertainment in the United States. An anime television series adaptation by Silver Link aired from January to March 2017. A second season will premiere in July 2023.

Plot
Masamune Makabe was a chubby boy who had a close relationship with Aki Adagaki, a beautiful wealthy girl, until one day she cruelly rejected him and gave him the nickname "Pig's Foot". Seeking revenge against his tormentor, Masamune changed his name, began dieting and working out every day to become a fit and handsome, albeit vain, high school student. When he encounters Aki once again, she does not recognize him and he commits to seduce her into falling in love with him before embarrassingly rejecting her to exact vengeance. Masamune ends up allying with Aki's classmate and servant Yoshino Koiwai, who seems to know Masamune's nickname as well.

Characters
 
 
 Masamune Makabe is the titular protagonist of the series. He is a handsome boy, but he was once a chubby kid that people liked to make fun of. In his childhood, he befriended Aki Adagaki but was brutally rejected by her after his love confession and nicknamed him , causing him to undergo several diets and training and also changed his family name thanks to his grandfather. He's also committed to getting revenge on Aki; planning to make Aki fall in love with him then cruelly reject her – calling this his "Dead or Love Plan". When Yoshino confesses that she was the real culprit, Masamune is torn to how he should reconcile with Aki. In a turn of events, Masamune properly affirms his love for Aki in the end.
 
 
 Aki comes from a well-off family and is known for her brutal treatment of men. As a result, she has gained the nickname  from her classmates. She allegedly rejected Masamune and gave him the nickname "Piggy" when the two were children leading to his transformation and commitment to revenge. It was later revealed that she had a crush on Masamune during their childhood and that her hatred of men stemmed from the incident, causing him to leave without saying anything and leaving Aki heartbroken. When Masamune finally confronts her about the past, she tells him that she never gave him the nickname "piggy" in the first place and never even heard of that nickname before. As Aki realizes Masamune's true identity, she attempts to make him the same chubby boy he used to be. Aki mentions she found his chubbiness "cute" and overall as a symbol of wealth, implying that chubby guys are her type. When she reads Masamune's entitles of revenge and hearing Yoshino's regrets, Aki decides to fix everything. With the misunderstood vengeance cleared up, Aki can't help but accept Masamune's honest heart.
 
 
 Yoshino is Aki's maid and follower. She seems to be a clumsy girl. However, beneath her clumsy and shy appearance, she is actually extremely deceptive and cold, able to deceive and hurt Aki without a second thought. Unlike Aki, Yoshino easily gained weight from sweets. Later, it was revealed that Yoshino had disguised herself as Aki eight years before, rejected Masamune, and gave him the nickname "Piggy" due to jealousy towards Aki's affection for him, but soon realized that her actions caused Aki to become estranged towards men. She has been regretting this and attempted to repay what she had done when Aki and Masamune reunited in high school. During the course of the story, in her attempts to set up Masamune and Aki, she becomes infatuated with Masamune. Aki learns of this and so she rejects Masamune and encourages Yoshino to be true to her feelings. However, Masamune refuses her confession and so Yoshino becomes determined to reunite them. Due to her and Masamune's efforts, Aki finally becomes true to her affection towards Masamune and they make up in the end with a kiss.
 
 
 Neko is a frail girl who comes from a wealthy family. She transferred to the school that Masamune is attending in the second manga volume and confessed her love soon afterward. Masamune rejects her feelings but she continues to support his choices. It is later revealed that Neko also used to be chubby and that she had fallen in love with him when they were children. Neko confronts Masamune with this info that he had forgotten when he starts doubting his feelings towards Aki. She tells him that she has also fallen in love with the person "that he is now". Due to her habit of not wearing any panties, Aki and Yoshino nicknamed her the "Commando Princess". On White Day, Neko tempts Aki to break up with Masamune, but despite learning about Neko's knowledge of Masamune's revenge who continues to pursue him anyway. 
 
 
 Masamune's class rep who loves BL and claimed to have confessed her feelings to Masamune once, but got rejected. Due to her hobby, she kind of loves pairing Masamune with Kojūrō.
 
 
 Masamune's best friend looks like a girl but is actually a guy. He has a crush on Neko.
 
 
 A chubby individual who claimed to be "Masamune" – Aki's childhood friend in the past. Later on, it is revealed that Kanetsugu is a female pretending to be a male. She disguised herself as Masamune so she could marry into the Adagaki family in an attempt to save her family from poverty. After Kanetsugu's true gender is exposed, she starts working part-time at school.

Media

Manga
Writer Hazuki Takeoka and Korean female artist Tiv began serializing the manga in the December 2012 issue of Ichijinsha's shōnen manga magazine Monthly Comic Rex on October 27, 2012. Ten tankōbon volumes were released between April 2013 and July 2018. A spin-off titled  is drawn by Yūki Shinichi and is serialized on Gekkan ComicREX starting from November 2016 issue. North American publisher Seven Seas Entertainment announced that they had licensed the series on September 4, 2015. The series concluded in 2018, with the final chapter being released on June 27. Takeoka and Tiv launched a spinoff manga in Monthly Comic Rex on September 27, 2018. The short manga, titled , is a series of after-stories focusing on various characters. After School spin-off released in tankōbon as 11th and finale volume of the main series. Another spin-off manga will begin serialization on Ichijinsha's new Comic Howl manga website in Q2 2023.

Light novel
A light novel adaptation by Hazuki Takeoka, with art by Tiv, has been published by Ichijinsha in a single volume released on December 20, 2013.

Anime
On June 23, 2016, publisher Ichijinsha announced that the series would receive an anime television series adaptation. The anime is produced by Silver Link and directed by Mirai Minato, with Michiko Yokote supervising the scripts, and Yokote and Kento Shimoyama writing the scripts, featuring character designs by Yūki Sawairi. Toshiki Kameyama is the series' sound director while Lantis produced the music. The opening theme is  performed by Ayaka Ohashi, and the ending theme is "Elemental World" performed by ChouCho. The AT-X broadcast uses the song  as its ending theme; it was sung by Ohashi and Suzuko Mimori under their respective character names Aki Adagaki and Neko Fujinomiya. The series aired from January 5 to March 23, 2017. It was broadcast on Tokyo MX, AT-X, and BS Fuji. The anime ran for 12 episodes and was released across six BD/DVD volumes. Crunchyroll streamed and licensed the series, while Funimation produced an English dub. An OVA of the series has been released and tells an "after story" for the manga.

On April 2, 2022, a second season titled Masamune-kun's Revenge R was announced. The main staff and cast members are reprising their roles. It was initially scheduled for April 2023, but was later delayed to July due to the COVID-19 pandemic affecting the production. The opening theme is "Please, please!" performed by Ayaka Ōhashi.

Reception
Reviewing the first volume, Rebecca Silverman of Anime News Network stated that the combination of revenge comedy and romance was "working thus far". She felt that Aki's servant was the most interesting character, but also enjoyed Masamune, especially how he had to "think about the correct response for each situation he finds himself in". She called Aki "utterly detestable", and noted that it would be difficult for the series to turn around and make her a romantic interest. She wrote that the art was attractive, but noted that the drawings of women were often anatomically incorrect.

The anime adaptation's first episode received poor reviews from Anime News Network's staff during the Winter 2017 season previews. Theron Martin enjoyed the series the most, stating that with the clichés he should have hated the first episode, but instead he found it quite entertaining. Other staffers weren't so positive. Nick Creamer called it a "fairly generic romcom premiere starring a very repugnant cast", while Bamboo Dong claimed it was "a plain piece of toast smeared with unresolved childhood memories of rejection" and complained about how males are portrayed as hapless victims of the heartless women. Jacob Chapman called the comedy "dehumanizing" and the episode was not engaging. Paul Jensen was more positive in that he found the story and characters were unusual enough to be interesting, but he had mixed feelings as he was not sure what the series wanted to be. Silverman states that the episode walks a fine line between comedy and cruelty and her strong dislike of Aki is definitely coloring this episode for her.

Fellow ANN editor Lauren Orsini chose Masamune-kun's Revenge as her pick for the Worst Anime of 2017, criticizing its "excessive cruelty" being delivered by the two main leads and the rest of the cast, concluding that, "This anime should only be viewed as an example of how not to win friends and influence people. The best revenge is a life well lived, as in, not Masamune's approach".

Notes

References

External links
  
 Masamune-kun's Revenge at Ichijinsha 
 Masamune-kun's Revenge at Seven Seas Entertainment
 

2013 Japanese novels
2017 anime television series debuts
2023 anime television series debuts
2023 manga
Anime and manga about revenge
Anime postponed due to the COVID-19 pandemic
Anime series based on manga
Crunchyroll anime
Ichijinsha Bunko
Ichijinsha manga
Light novels
Romantic comedy anime and manga
Seven Seas Entertainment titles
Shōnen manga
Silver Link
Tokyo MX original programming
Upcoming anime television series